Carex brunnea, the greater brown sedge, is a small species of plant found in many parts of Asia, as well as eastern Australia and Lord Howe Island. This plant is often seen in disturbed, sunny areas in and near rainforest. This is one of many plants described by Robert Brown and was published in his Prodromus Florae Novae Hollandiae et Insulae Van Diemen (1810). Brown recorded the type  "(J.) v.v." Brown's name of Carex gracilis was ruled invalid, as the plant had previously appeared in scientific literature in 1784. Published by the Swedish naturalist Carl Peter Thunberg, in Murray's Systema Vegetabilium, 14th edition.

References

brunnea
Plants described in 1784
Flora of Lord Howe Island
Flora of New South Wales
Flora of Queensland
Flora of Mauritius
Flora of tropical Asia
Flora of Japan
Flora of China